Jack Peter Grealish (born 10 September 1995) is an English professional footballer who plays as a winger or attacking midfielder for  club Manchester City and the England national team.

Grealish joined Aston Villa at the age of six, and made his debut for the club in May 2014, following a loan at Notts County. In 2021, Grealish signed for Manchester City in a transfer deal worth £100 million, making him the most expensive English player ever.

Born in England and having Irish ancestry, Grealish was eligible to represent either England or the Republic of Ireland internationally, Grealish was capped by the Republic of Ireland up to under-21 level before confirming his decision to play for England in April 2016. He played for the England under-21s for the first time in May 2016, winning the 2016 Toulon Tournament.

Early life
Grealish was born in Birmingham, West Midlands and raised in nearby Solihull. He attended Our Lady of Compassion Roman Catholic Primary School and St Peter's Roman Catholic Secondary School in Solihull.

Grealish is of Irish descent, through his maternal grandfather from County Dublin, his paternal grandfather from Gort, County Galway, and his paternal grandmother from Sneem, County Kerry. Influenced by his Irish heritage, Grealish played Gaelic football for John Mitchel's Hurling and Camogie Club of Warwickshire GAA between the ages of 10 and 14. He competed against former Aston Villa and current Manchester United defender Aoife Mannion, a school classmate of his, at Gaelic football.

Grealish's younger brother, Keelan, died of sudden infant death syndrome in April 2000 at the age of nine months.

His great-great-grandfather, Billy Garraty, was also a footballer, who earned one England cap and won the 1905 FA Cup Final with Aston Villa.

Club career

Aston Villa

Academy success
Having started at Highgate United,
Grealish, a lifelong Aston Villa fan, joined the club as a six-year-old. At the age of 16, he was named as an unused substitute in a 4–2 home Premier League defeat against Chelsea on 31 March 2012. Grealish was part of the club's under-19 team that won the 2012–13 NextGen Series, scoring in a 3–1 extra-time win over Sporting CP in the semi-final.

2013–2015

On 13 September 2013, Grealish joined League One club Notts County on a youth loan until 13 January 2014. Among his teammates that season was fellow loanee midfielder Callum McGregor, a future Scottish international. He made his professional debut the following day, coming on as a 59th-minute substitute for David Bell in a 3–1 away defeat to Milton Keynes Dons. On 7 December, he scored his first career goal, beating three defenders to score the last goal in a 3–1 win over Gillingham at Meadow Lane, and followed this a week later by opening a 4–0 victory at Colchester United. Grealish extended his loan with Notts County on 17 January 2014 until the end of the season. He ended his loan with five goals and seven assists in 38 appearances. At the end of his loan with Notts County, Grealish returned to Aston Villa and made his club debut on 7 May, coming on as an 88th-minute substitute for Ryan Bertrand in a 4–0 away defeat to Manchester City in the Premier League.

With his contract due to expire in the summer of 2015, he was offered a new four-year deal by the club in September 2014. On 14 October, Grealish signed a new four-year contract with Aston Villa. Grealish made his first start in an FA Cup third round tie on 4 January 2015 against Blackpool at Villa Park, which his team won 1–0. He played 75 minutes before being substituted for Andreas Weimann. On 7 March, in the sixth round, a 2–0 home win over West Bromwich Albion, he replaced Charles N'Zogbia after 74 minutes, and was sent off for a second booking for diving in added time. On 7 April, Grealish started his first match for Aston Villa in the Premier League, a 3–3 home draw against Queens Park Rangers in which his performance was highly praised. In the FA Cup semi-final against Liverpool at Wembley Stadium, Grealish played a part in both of Villa's goals including assisting Fabian Delph's winner, as they came from behind to advance to the final. On 30 May, Grealish played the entirety of the 2015 FA Cup Final at Wembley Stadium, as Villa lost 4–0 to Arsenal.

In April 2015, Grealish was warned by Aston Villa manager Tim Sherwood after The Sun published images showing him allegedly inhaling nitrous oxide for recreational purposes. Sherwood said that "We can't condone that behaviour. He is now in a responsible position as a professional footballer, he's got to make sure it won't happen again". Grealish scored his first goal for Villa on 13 September 2015, a 20-yard shot to open the scoring away to Leicester City; however, his team lost 3–2. In November, he chose to stay in North West England and go clubbing after Villa's 4–0 loss to Everton. New manager Rémi Garde punished him for this decision by making Grealish train with the under-21 team, and stated that "You have to behave as a professional and it was not the case this time for Jack". He returned to full training on 8 December.

2016–2019
On 7 January 2016, Leeds United head coach Steve Evans said that Villa had rejected an enquiry to take Grealish on loan. Villa finished the season in last place, ending their status as Premier League ever-presents. Grealish played 16 matches, all defeats, breaking a record for worst season previously held by Sunderland's Sean Thornton, who lost in all 11 of his appearances in 2002–03. In September, Villa opened an internal disciplinary investigation after reports that Grealish was at a party at a Birmingham hotel which had to be shut down by the police in the early morning. In response, owner Tony Xia wrote on Twitter that Grealish had to focus on and off the pitch, and associate with the right people. In October, he was suspended for three matches after accepting a charge of violent conduct following a stamp on Conor Coady in Villa's 1–1 draw with Wolverhampton Wanderers.

On 10 March 2019, Grealish was assaulted by a pitch invader during the derby match away to Birmingham City. Later in the second half, he scored to give Villa a 1–0 victory. A 27-year-old man from Rubery was arrested. He appeared on 11 March at Birmingham Magistrates' Court charged with encroachment on to the pitch and assault. He pleaded guilty to the offences and was sent to prison for 14 weeks. Grealish captained the team from March onwards, a period which saw them amass a club-record 10 league wins in a row. This form granted Villa a place in the play-offs where victories over West Bromwich Albion and Derby County gained them promotion to the Premier League after an absence of three years.

Grealish's first goal of the 2019–20 season came in the second round of the 2019–20 EFL Cup against Crewe Alexandra on 27 August 2019. His first Premier League goal of the season came on 5 October, netting his side's third goal in a 5–1 away win over Norwich City. The result lifted the club out of the bottom three and leapfrogged their opponents in the Premier League table.

2020–2021
In March 2020, the Premier League was suspended midway through Aston Villa's return season, due to the COVID-19 pandemic in the United Kingdom. During that enforced break, it was revealed that Grealish had violated government guidance to stay home. He accepted that his actions were "wrong and entirely unnecessary" and was fined by the club.

Grealish was fouled 167 times across the 2019–20 Premier League season; this was the most fouls won by a player in a single Premier League campaign, with Grealish passing the record with over eight matches remaining in the season. He scored on the final day, as Aston Villa clinched survival in the Premier League with a 1–1 draw against West Ham United, as their relegation rivals Watford lost 3–2 to Arsenal. At the club's end of season awards, Grealish was voted the Villa's Player of the Season by both the supporters and his fellow players. He also finished the season as the club's leading goalscorer with eight goals in the Premier League and 10 in all competitions.

On 15 September 2020, Grealish signed a new five-year contract with Villa until 2025. He scored his first league goal of the campaign in Villa's second match on 28 September; the first goal in a 3–0 win at newly-promoted Fulham. On 4 October, he scored twice and provided three assists in a 7–2 home victory over Liverpool. It was Liverpool's heaviest defeat in 57 years and was the first time in Premier League history that a reigning champion had conceded seven goals in a single match. It took almost a month for Grealish to score again, when he netted a 97th-minute goal against Southampton, although it was not enough as Villa lost 4–3.

Manchester City

On 5 August 2021, Manchester City announced that they had signed Grealish on a six-year contract that would run until 2027. It was reported by numerous outlets that the transfer fee paid to Aston Villa was for the amount of £100 million, which constituted the most expensive transfer of an English player ever, as well as the highest fee ever paid by a British club. Grealish was given the number 10 shirt by the team which had previously been worn by club legend Sergio Agüero, who departed from City the month prior after ten seasons with the team. Ten days later, Grealish made his debut for City on a 1–0 defeat against Tottenham Hotspur on the first matchday of the 2021–22 Premier League. On 21 August, Grealish scored his first goal for the club in a 5–0 win over Norwich City. He scored on his Champions League debut on 15 September, putting City 4–2 up in an eventual 6–3 home victory over RB Leipzig in the opening group stage match. He also assisted Nathan Aké's goal for City's opener.

Personal life
In March 2020, Grealish was found to have violated government guidance to stay at home in relation to COVID-19 regulations and was fined by Aston Villa. Grealish was banned from driving for nine months in the UK and fined £82,499 after pleading guilty to two counts of careless driving in March and October 2020, one in which he was filmed colliding with several parked cars during a turn in the road.

International career

Republic of Ireland

While playing in Irish youth teams, England were known to have been pursuing him, even naming him in their under-17 team in 2011 at the age of 15 – an invitation he declined. After being left off the Republic of Ireland under-21 team for three qualifiers in October 2012, the English FA made an approach for him to switch. Republic of Ireland under-21 manager Noel King said in May 2013 that the 17-year-old was pondering a switch to England so he was not considered for a friendly against Denmark, although King later stepped in to assure Grealish and his family that he was a part of his plans.

Grealish made his under-21 debut for the Republic of Ireland as a late substitute against the Faroe Islands in August 2013. In 2013, Grealish reaffirmed his desire to continue representing Ireland.

In August 2014, Grealish was again named to the Republic of Ireland under-21 squad. It was initially reported that he would decline the call up to the under-21s due to being undecided over his international future, however Grealish did turn out for the Republic of Ireland in a 2–0 loss against Germany. It later emerged that Grealish had actually declined a call-up to the senior Irish team after talks with Martin O'Neill. In October 2014, Grealish pulled out of a Republic of Ireland under-21 squad for a game against Norway to play in a behind closed doors friendly for his club Aston Villa and England under-21 manager Gareth Southgate confirmed that the Football Association were monitoring the player's situation. Reports emerged on 17 October that Grealish had declared for Ireland and would make his senior debut the next month but this was denied by the player. Grealish was awarded the Under-21 player of the year by the Football Association of Ireland in March 2015 where he announced that he had taken a break from youth internationals over the past year to focus on breaking into the Aston Villa first team and that he expected to be back playing for Ireland in the near future. 

In May 2015, O'Neill confirmed that Grealish had turned down another call-up to the Irish senior squad, this time for a friendly against England and a European Championship qualifier against Scotland. England manager Roy Hodgson disclosed that although he had been in contact with Grealish, he had chosen not to include him in their squad to face Ireland in case of a backlash. In August 2015, Hodgson met with Grealish to discuss his future.

England
On 28 September 2015, Grealish confirmed that he had decided to represent England at international level. He made his debut for England under-21s on 19 May 2016 as a 72nd-minute substitute for Ruben Loftus-Cheek in a 1–0 win over Portugal at the Toulon Tournament. On his first start four days later he scored twice in the first half of a 7–1 win over Guinea. England went on to win the tournament for the first time since 1994. Grealish was named in the squad for England under-21 at the 2017 UEFA European Under-21 Championship. From 2016 to 2017, he made seven appearances for the under-21s, scoring two goals.

On 31 August 2020, for the first time, Grealish was called up to the senior England squad for the UEFA Nations League fixtures against Iceland and Denmark. On 8 September, he made his senior debut as a 76th-minute substitute in a 0–0 draw against Denmark.

On 1 June 2021, Grealish was named in the 26-man squad for the newly rescheduled UEFA Euro 2020. On 29 June, in the Round of 16 match against Germany, Grealish was introduced as a substitute in the 68th minute and contributed directly to both goals in a 2–0 win, playing in Luke Shaw to assist Raheem Sterling, and crossing for Harry Kane to head in late in the match. On 9 October 2021, Grealish scored his first international goal after being introduced as a substitute in the 73rd minute during England's 2022 FIFA World Cup qualification match against Andorra. During England's first match of the 2022 FIFA World Cup on 21 November 2022 against Iran, Grealish scored his second international goal and England's sixth of the match.

Style of play
A technically gifted player, Grealish plays as a winger (normally on the left flank, a position which allows him to cut inside onto his stronger right foot) or attacking midfielder, and has been noted for his ability to run and dribble past defenders. Bryan Jones, Aston Villa's former academy director, likened his playing style to that of Nottingham Forest winger John Robertson, citing his "ability to just ghost past people". During his time with Manchester City, he was occasionally also used in a central attacking role as a false 9 by manager Pep Guardiola.

Despite not being gifted with exceptional speed, he is an agile player who possesses quick foot-work, a good change of pace, and excellent balance on the ball, as a result of his low centre of gravity. As a consequence of his nimble movement, Grealish has notably been on the receiving end of heavier, more physical challenges from opposing players. Shaun Derry, his manager at Notts County, highlighted this, following fixtures against Sheffield United and Stevenage in early 2014 and called for more official protection. In a 2014 match for Aston Villa against Hull City at Villa Park, a number of fouls committed against Grealish resulted in three Hull players receiving yellow cards within just a 15-minute period.

Grealish wears child-sized shin pads whilst playing, in order to maintain his ability to control the ball effectively. He wears his football socks rolled down due to superstition, which has led to referees warning him to pull them up. In addition to his ball skills, Grealish is also known for his ability to create chances for his teammates.

Aston Villa manager Tim Sherwood said in May 2015 that Grealish was learning from his friendship with his midfield partner, the experienced Joe Cole. Sherwood considered Cole a role model for Grealish's private life, as he "didn't read too much about Joe being on the front pages".

On 12 February 2021, in an interview with Talksport, Aston Villa teammate Emiliano Martínez described Grealish as "the most talented player [he had] ever seen" and expressed surprise that he had not played more games for England. Martínez went on to say: "he never gives the ball away. When I see Grealish running, it's always a shot on target or a corner for us. He will drive past two or three players". Martínez also drew comparisons of Grealish to his Argentina teammate, Lionel Messi. When writing for The Athletic in 2019, sports journalist Michael Cox described Grealish as an "old-school player," due to his playing style.

Allegations of diving
Despite his ability and deft work on the ball, Grealish has on numerous occasions been criticised for going down too easily and allegedly diving to win penalties and free kicks. Former Liverpool defender Steve Nicol has said, "Jack Grealish throws himself on the ground 50 times a game. I was actually looking at the clock today. The first time he went down was just under a minute on the clock. The next one was on three minutes! [It's] Most embarrassing. He threw himself on the ground where the dugouts were. Just embarrassing. He is a brilliant player. He really spoils it for me when I'm watching." He was booked for a dive against Crystal Palace, which led to an equalising goal from Villa being disallowed. Former Birmingham City and England defender Matthew Upson has criticised him, saying: "We could see it here and we are a fair distance away. Jack Grealish waited for the contact and literally just dived on the floor... I can see Grealish having a cheeky little chuckle to himself and happy with the free-kick he has just won."

However, he has defended himself, saying that the fact he is the most fouled player in the league suggests defenders make more mistakes trying to stop him, thus giving away more penalties and free kicks. This was supported by statistics, with Grealish officially being the most fouled player in the 2020–21 Premier League season.

Sponsorship

Grealish is sponsored by PUMA, having previously been sponsored by Nike.

Career statistics

Club

International

England score listed first, score column indicates score after each Grealish goal

Honours
Aston Villa Youth
NextGen Series: 2012–13

Aston Villa
EFL Championship play-offs: 2019
FA Cup runner-up: 2014–15
EFL Cup runner-up: 2019–20

Manchester City
Premier League: 2021–22

England U21
Toulon Tournament: 2016

England
UEFA European Championship runner-up: 2020

Individual
PFA Team of the Year: 2018–19 Championship
Aston Villa Player of the Season: 2019–20
Aston Villa Young Player of the Season: 2014–15
FAI Under-17 Irish International Player of the Year: 2012
FAI Under-21 Irish International Player of the Year: 2015

References

External links

Profile at the Manchester City F.C. website
Profile at the Football Association website
Profile at the Football Association of Ireland website

1995 births
Living people
Sportspeople from Solihull
Footballers from Birmingham, West Midlands
English footballers
Republic of Ireland association footballers
Association football midfielders
Association football wingers
Aston Villa F.C. players
Notts County F.C. players
Manchester City F.C. players
English Football League players
Premier League players
FA Cup Final players
Republic of Ireland youth international footballers
Republic of Ireland under-21 international footballers
England under-21 international footballers
England international footballers
UEFA Euro 2020 players
2022 FIFA World Cup players
Gaelic footballers who switched code
English people of Irish descent
English victims of crime